The Cathedral of the Air is a Norman-Gothic military chapel in Lakehurst, New Jersey, United States. It was conceived by Reverend Gill Robb Wilson, one-time national chaplain of the American Legion, and is intended to serve the military personnel serving at the Joint Base McGuire–Dix–Lakehurst. The chapel features stained glass windows memorializing the loss of naval airships USS Akron and USS Shenandoah. Both airships had been based at the nearby Lakehurst Naval Air Station.

Originally used primarily as a Roman Catholic church, it no longer holds regular services and is used as a non-denominational location for weddings, baptisms and funerals.

External links 
 Joint Base McGuire-Dix-Lakehurst Chapels

References 

Churches in Ocean County, New Jersey
Gothic Revival church buildings in New Jersey
Military chapels of the United States